Samantha Crawford was the defending champion, but lost to Sofia Kenin in the first round.

Beatriz Haddad Maia won the title, defeating Kristie Ahn in the final, 7–6(7–4), 7–6(7–2).

Seeds

Main draw

Finals

Top half

Bottom half

References 
 Main draw

CopperWynd Pro Women's Challenge - Singles